José Luiz "Zé Luiz" de Oliveira (born 16 November 1904, date of death unknown) was a Brazilian football player. He played for the Brazil national football team at the 1930 FIFA World Cup finals.

He played club football for Palmeiras and São Cristóvão, winning the 1926 Campeonato Carioca with São Cristóvão.

Honours

Club
 Campeonato Carioca (1): 
São Cristóvão: 1926

References

1904 births
Year of death missing
Footballers from Rio de Janeiro (city)
Brazilian footballers
Brazil international footballers
1930 FIFA World Cup players
Sociedade Esportiva Palmeiras players
Association football defenders